Walter Sullivan may refer to:
Walter Sullivan (Silent Hill), fictional character from the video game Silent Hill 4: The Room
Walter Francis Sullivan (1928–2012), American Catholic bishop
Walter J. Sullivan (1923–2014), American politician
Walter Sullivan (journalist) (1918–1996), science writer
Walter Sullivan (novelist) (1924–2006), author and literary critic in the United States
Walter Sullivan (actor), Australian actor